The front of the mountain war between 1915 and 1917 ran from the pass of Stilfser Joch on the Swiss border, over the Ortler and the Adamello mountains to the northern shores of Lake Garda. It continued east of the Etsch then ran over the Pasubio and on to the Sette Comuni. From there the Italian Isonzo armies threatened Austria-Hungary in the rear, which is why it can be described as a two-front war.

References

Literature 
 Österreichisches Bundesministerium für Heereswesen; Kriegsarchiv Wien (Hrsg.): Österreich-Ungarns letzter Krieg 1914–1918. 1931 vom Verlag der Militärwissenschaftlichen Mitteilungen, Wien (archive.org).
 Jordan, Alexander: Krieg um die Alpen. Der Erste Weltkrieg im Alpenraum und der bayerische Grenzschutz in Tirol. (Zeitgeschichtliche Forschungen 35), Berlin 2008 (mit ausführlicher Darstellung von Forschungsstand und Literatur).
 Wolfgang Etschmann: Die Südfront 1915–1918. In: Klaus Eisterer, Rolf Steininger (Hrsg.): Tirol und der Erste Weltkrieg. (= Innsbrucker Forschungen zur Zeitgeschichte, Band 12), Wien/Innsbruck 1995, S. 27–60.
 Hubert Fankhauser, Wilfried Gallin: Unbesiegt und doch geschlagen. Der Gebirgskrieg an Kärntens Grenze, 1915–1917. Verlagsbuchhandlung Stöhr, Wien, 2005.
 Ingomar Pust: Die steinerne Front. Vom Isonzo zur Piave. Auf den Spuren des Gebirgskrieges in den Julischen Alpen. Ares Verlag, Graz, 3. Auflage 2009. .
 Walther Schaumann: Schauplätze des Gebirgskrieges in 5 Bänden. Ghedina & Tassotti Editori, Cortina, 1973.
 Gabriele und Walther Schaumann: Unterwegs vom Plöckenpass zum Kanaltal. Auf den Spuren der Karnischen Front, 1915–1917. Verlag Mohorjeva – Hermagoras, Klagenfurt, 2004 (mit Tourenführer)
 Der einsame Krieg. Hornung, München 1974, Athesia-Verlag, Aufl. 2–7, 1976-2007, .
 Spielhahnstoss und Edelweiss – Die Geschichte der Kaiserschützen. Leopold Stocker Verlag, Graz 1977, .
 Heinz von Lichem: Der Tiroler Hochgebirgskrieg 1915–1918 im Luftbild. Steiger, Innsbruck 1985, .
 Heinz von Lichem: Gebirgskrieg 1915–1918. (3 Bände), Athesia, Bozen.
 Ortler, Adamello, Gardasee. (Band 1) 1996, .
 Die Dolomitenfront von Trient bis zum Kreuzbergsattel. (Band 2) 1997, .
 Erwin Steinböck:  Die Kämpfe um den Plöckenpaß 1915/17. Militärhistorische Schriftenreihe, Heft 2. Österreichischer Bundesverlag Gesellschaft m. b. H., Wien 1988, .
 Uwe Nettelbeck: Der Dolomitenkrieg. Zweitausendeins: Frankfurt/M. 1979. Eine Neuausgabe erschien 2014, bebildert und mit einem Nachwort von Detlev Claussen. Berenberg Verlag, Berlin, .

With focus on combatants:
 Walter Gauss: Kreuze in Ladinien im Herzen von Ladinien. Athesia Bozen 2000.
 Vasja Klavora: Plavi Križ. Mohorjeva založba, Celovec/Ljubljana/Dunaj 1993 (slowenisch).
 Manfried Rauchensteiner: Der Tod des Doppeladlers. Österreich-Ungarn und der Erste Weltkrieg. Graz/Wien/Köln 1997.
 Mark Thompson: The White War. Life and Death on the Italian Front 1915–1919. Faber and Faber, London 2008.  (englisch, Fokus auf das Geschehen in der italienischen Armee).

With focus on the Mountain War:
 Ernest Hemingway: A Farewell to Arms. Erstausgabe: Jonathan Cape Limited, 1929. Arrow Books, London 1994.
 Luis Trenker: Berge in Flammen. Ein Roman aus den Schicksalstagen Südtirols. 1931.

External links 

 Bilder von den Schlachtfeldern der Südwest-Front 1915–1918
 Storia ed itinerari della Grande Guerra 1915–1918 … „per non dimenticare“ (Geschichte und Weganlagen des Ersten Weltkriegs 1915–1918 … „um nicht zu vergessen“) auf www.cimeetrincee.it (italienisch)
 Rupert Gietl: The Austro-Hungarian emplacements on top of Mt. Roteck (2390m) Dolomites / South-Tyrol, Budapest 2012 (englisch)
 Krieg in den Dolomiten (italienisch)

Campaigns and theatres of World War I